Matam Department is one of the 45 departments of Senegal, one of the three in the Matam Region in the north-east of the country.

The department has four communes: Matam, Ourossogui, Thilogne and Nguidjilone.

Rural districts (Communautés rurales) comprise:
Arrondissement of Agnam Civol:
Agnam Civol
Dabia
Oréfondé
Arrondissement of Ogo:
Nabadji Civol
Ogo (Matam)
Bokidiawé

Historic Sites
 Building housing the Government of Matam
 Building housing Matam school 
 The Residence of Diorbivol Matam
 The old village of Sinthiou Bara
 The old village of Ogo

References

Departments of Senegal
Matam Region